Garrison FM was a network of radio stations in the United Kingdom serving British Army bases around the country. The station broadcast a mixture of music, news, and chat, their emphasis being to bring news of military-related issues to soldiers and their families, as well as the wider public in general.

History

The station was founded in 2001 by the former BBC Radio 1 disc jockey Mark Page, and came into being after an Army Communications initiative to establish a radio service for its troops in the UK. With a remit to provide news and entertainment to soldiers and their families, the station also enabled those posted on active service to stay in contact with their families.

Garrison FM expanded to serve several military bases, including Catterick, Aldershot, Edinburgh and Colchester.  On 26 January 2012, Garrison FM switched on two more transmitters in Inverness, making the city the second in Scotland to receive the service after Edinburgh.

On 31 March 2013, the Ministry of Defence merged Garrison Radio's contract with that of overseas forces' station BFBS. BFBS then took over all six Garrison stations, adding them to the four it already ran in Northern Ireland. BFBS continues to operate the six stations as part of their UK Bases network.

References

External links
Garrison FM

British Army
Radio stations established in 2001
Defunct radio stations in the United Kingdom